Karnataka has about 240 Talukas. The table below lists all the talukas in the state of Karnataka, India, by district.

The urban status is listed for the headquarters town of the taluka, rural talukas are much larger. Urban status follows the census standard.

Level of each administration.
 City Corporation (Mahanagara Palike)
 City Municipal Council (Nagarasabe)
 Town Municipal Council (Purasabe)
 Town Panchayat (Pura Panchayiti)
 Village Panchayat (Grama Panchayiti)

References

 Davanagere Dt. Channagiri
Karnataka